The Gaza Marathon is a marathon race in the Gaza Strip organized by UNRWA to raise funds for the UNWRA Summer Games program for children in Gaza. In addition to the full marathon race (42.195 km, 26 miles 385 yards), there is also a half-marathon race and a  race.

The event was held for the first time on May 5, 2011, attracting more than 1,500 participants.

In 2012, Gaza held the first international marathon welcoming runners from different parts of the world to run along around 2,000 runners from Gaza including participants with special needs, women and girls to raise funds for Palestine refugee children.

In 2013 the marathon was scheduled for April 10, but was cancelled following "the decision by the authorities in Gaza not to allow women to participate".

Course and conditions
The course spans the entire Gaza Strip, from Beit Hanoun near the border with Israel in the northeast to Rafah, near the Egyptian border in the south. From Beit Hanoun the course runs west toward the Mediterranean coast, and then follows the coastal road southwest, parallel to the coast, before turning inland to Rafah. The route passes battered towns, refugee camps, the fishing harbor, the ruins of Yasser Arafat's former presidential compound, and the shells of other buildings hit in Israeli air strikes.

The course is mostly flat but conditions in May tend to be very hot. There are no road closures, and in addition to potholes, runners have to negotiate traffic, including donkey carts and vans.

The organizers work with the local security authorities, currently run by the Hamas government, to ensure the runners' safety and also have to consider local sensitivities regarding male and female athletes running side-by-side. Following the inaugural race in 2011, UNWRA spokesman Chris Gunness said, "The Israeli authorities have kept many things out of Gaza but we are trying to make sure that the one thing that can get through the blockade is fun. The marathon definitely achieved that not just for the competitors but for the thousands and thousands of onlookers who applauded every runner."

2011 race 
The race started at sunrise, 6 a.m. on May 5, when the temperature had already reached .

About fifty runners started the course, with just nine runners completing the full distance. Of these, seven were Palestinian athletes training for the next year's Olympics.

The winner, with a time of 2:42:47, was Nader al-Masri, who competed for Palestine at the 2008 Beijing Olympics in the 5,000-meter race, and who was training for the 2012 Olympics in London. There were two international participants, both of them UNRWA employees running a marathon for the first time. One of them, Gemma Connell, was the only woman who ran the entire race. She finished with a time of 4 hours and forty-five minutes.

UNRWA organized the event as a fund-raiser for its Summer Games for Gaza school children. The goal was to raise one million US dollars for the Summer Games; UNRWA said the goal was exceeded.

References

Marathons in Asia
Sports competitions in the State of Palestine
Athletics in the State of Palestine
Sport in the Gaza Strip
Spring (season) events in the State of Palestine
Annual events in the State of Palestine
Recurring sporting events established in 2011
2011 establishments in the Palestinian territories